Umm-e-Hani (born 12 August 1996) is a Pakistani cricketer who plays as a right-arm off break bowler.

In October 2022, she was named in Women's One Day International (WODI) squads for Ireland's tour of Pakistan. She made her WODI debut on 9 November 2022 against Ireland at Gaddafi Stadium, Lahore.

References

External links
 
 

1996 births
Living people
Cricketers from Faisalabad
Pakistani women cricketers
Pakistan women One Day International cricketers
Lahore women cricketers
Higher Education Commission women cricketers